The Ljubljana Ring Road is a motorway ring road around the city of Ljubljana. The ring road forms the main hub of the Slovenian motorway network and connects to the A1 and A2 motorways. It was built from 1979 till 1999 and consists of four bypass sections: the northern bypass, the eastern bypass, the southern bypass, and the western bypass. The ring road itself is signed as the A1 on the southern and eastern parts, the A2 on the western and southern parts, while the northern sections are signed as the H3 expressway. The outer ring is 29.1 km long, while the inner ring is 28.65 km long. The average daily traffic (AADT) is the highest on the northern sections and at more than 70,000 vehicles is also the highest in Slovenia. A toll sticker system has been in use on the Ljubljana Ring Road since 1 July 2008.

References

Highways in Slovenia
Roads in Slovenia
Ring roads
Buildings and structures completed in 1999
Ring Road
Ring Road
Ring Road
Ring Road
Ring Road
Ring Road
Ring Road
Ring Road
Ring Road
Ring Road
Ring Road
Ring Road
Ring Road
1999 establishments in Slovenia